Canning Paschim Assembly constituency is a Legislative Assembly constituency of South 24 Parganas district in the Indian State of West Bengal. It is reserved for Scheduled Castes.

Overview
As per order of the Delimitation Commission in respect of the Delimitation of constituencies in the West Bengal, Canning Paschim Assembly constituency is composed of the following:
 Canning I community development block
 Narayanpur gram panchayat of Canning II community development block

Canning Paschim Assembly constituency is a part of No. 19 Jaynagar (Lok Sabha constituency).

Members of Legislative Assembly

Election Results

2021

2011

Legislative Assembly Elections 1977-2006
In 2006, Dwijapada Mondal of CPI(M) won the Canning Paschim Assembly constituency defeating his nearest rival, Gobinda Chandra Naskar of AITC. In 2001, Gobinda Chandra Naskar of AITC defeated Bimal Mistry of CPI(M). Bimal Mistry of CPI(M) defeated Bhaskar Sinha of INC in 1996 and 1991. Gobinda Chandra Naskar of INC defeated Chittaranjan Mirdha of CPI(M) in 1987. Chittaranjan Mirdha of CPI(M) defeated Gobinda Chandra Naskar of INC in 1982 and 1977.

Legislative Assembly Elections 1957-1972
Gobinda Chandra Naskar of INC won the Canning Assembly constituency in 1972 and 1971. Narayan Naskar of INC won in 1969. A.C.Halder of Bangla Congress won in 1967. Khagendra Nath Naskar of INC won in 1962. In 1957, Canning Assembly constituency had joint seats. Khagendra Nath Naskar and Abdus Shukur, both of INC, won. The seat did not exist prior to that.

References

Notes

Citations

Assembly constituencies of West Bengal
Politics of South 24 Parganas district